The Teledyne CAE F408 is an American turbofan engine developed for a number of UAVs, drones, and cruise missiles in the late 1980s.

Design and development
The F408 (Model number 382-10) is a bypass turbofan whose fan stage is followed by a mixed-flow compressor, slinger-type combustor, and single-stage turbine. The turbine design is similar to that of the earlier Model 373-8B, while the compressor and fan are more advanced in design.

The development of the F408 began in 1985, with test runs beginning in 1989.

Applications
 BQM-145 Peregrine
 Eclipse 500 (first prototype)

Specifications

References 

Teledyne Technologies
Turbofan engines